LBP may refer to:

Sport
 Liga de Baloncesto Puertorriqueña, the tier-two men’s basketball professional league in Puerto Rico.

Medicine
 Lipopolysaccharide binding protein
 Low back pain, a common muscle disorder

People
 Lester B. Pearson, Canadian Prime Minister
 Luhut Binsar Pandjaitan, Indonesian politician

Organisations
 Lok Bhalai Party, an Indian religional political party
 Lok Biradari Prakalp, a NGO in Maharashtra, India

Other
 Length between perpendiculars, a measure of a ship's length
 Lebanese pound, the currency of Lebanon
 LittleBigPlanet, a video game series
 Local binary patterns, a type of visual descriptor
 Long Banga Airport, Malaysia (by IATA code)

See also